Liometopum lubricum is an extinct species of Miocene ant in the genus Liometopum. Described by Zhang, Sun and Zhang 1994, the fossils were found in China.

References

†
Fossil taxa described in 1994
Miocene insects
†
Fossil ant taxa